Galla Gaulo or Galla Lupanio was the fifth traditional Doge of Venice (755–756).

History
Gaulo was elected to the throne after deposing and blinding his predecessor, Teodato Ipato. He came to power at a time when there were three clear factions in Venice: the pro-Byzantine faction supported a strong doge and close political relations with the Byzantine Empire; the pro-Frankish party supported moving closer to the new Carolingian dynasty (enemies of Lombards and Greeks); and the republican party wished to assert as much independence as possible and to remain outside any larger power's sphere of influence. Galla was probably pro-Frankish.

He barely survived on the throne for a year before he was deposed, blinded, and exiled as Teodato had been. He is regarded as the traditional founder of the Barozzi family.

Sources
Norwich, John Julius. A History of Venice. Alfred A. Knopf: New York City, 1982.

8th-century Doges of Venice
756 deaths